José Alejandro Bernheim (1822–1893) was a French journalist of Jewish origin. He served as typographer of the Ejército Grande under the command of Justo José de Urquiza.

Biography 

Bernheim was born in Mulhouse, Alsace (France). After completing his elementary studies, he moved to Strasbourg where serve in the newspaper Courier du Bas-Rhin. In 1850, he arrived at the port of Montevideo and then settled in Buenos Aires where he opened a printing press on the Calle Defensa (neighborhood of San Nicolás). His business was specially dedicated to French and English language publications, and aimed at members of those communities established in Buenos Aires.
 
José Alejandro Bernheim founded the newspapers La República and Le Courrier de la Plata, published for the French community of Buenos Aires. In his printing office were made of the bulletins of war written by Domingo Faustino Sarmiento, a complete version of his works in tribute to the Argentine statesman.

References 

1822 births
1893 deaths
People from Buenos Aires
French people of Jewish descent
French people of German-Jewish descent
French male journalists
19th-century French newspaper founders
Río de la Plata